Mikhail Aleksandrovich Gulko (born July 23, 1931 in Kharkiv, Ukrainian SSR, USSR) is an author and performer of Russian chanson.

In 1980 he moved to New York City to continue his musical career.  He has toured Russia regularly since 1993.

References

External links
 Portal Russian chanson
 Mikhail Gulko,   The Godfather   in Russian chanson
  Songs Mikhail Gulko

1931 births
Russian singer-songwriters
Russian male singer-songwriters
20th-century American singers
20th-century Russian singers
Living people
Musicians from Kharkiv
Russian people of Ukrainian descent
Soviet male singer-songwriters
Soviet emigrants to the United States
20th-century American male singers
Russian chanson